The Mighty Kong is a 1998 American animated monster musical film. It is an adaptation of the classic King Kong story, produced by Lana Productions and is the 7th entry in the King Kong franchise. Jodi Benson and Dudley Moore (in his final role before his death in 2002) headed its cast of voice actors. The film was animated overseas by the South Korean animation studios including Hahn Shin Corporation, and by Jade Animation in Hong Kong. It features original songs by the Sherman Brothers.  The film was released on VHS on June 16, 1998 by Warner Bros. Home Entertainment as a part of their 75th Anniversary promotion. It was released on DVD by Tri-Coast Entertainment in 2019 as a Manufacture-on-Demand (MOD) release that is only available through online stores. The film is currently available on multiple streaming platforms such as Tubi and Vimeo.

Plot summary
Ann Darrow, a down-on-her-luck actress looking for work, meets film director Carl Denham, who offers her a job in a new film. They board the Venture to leave for the film shoot. The monkey that lives on board causes trouble throughout the trip. They arrive on the island and after a run-in with the natives, Ann then sacrificed to the giant ape King Kong who makes off with her into the jungle. Together they fight a Tyrannosaurus, Pterodactylus and a Gigantophis.

The film then follows Kong's rampage of New York City. Kong takes Ann up on top of the Empire State Building. The biplanes come and attack Kong with guns, but miss most of the time. When all the planes have been knocked down the army sends two blimps with a net in between them to catch Kong. They catch him successfully. Kong tries to get out of the net, but the net rips and when Kong reaches for Ann, he falls from the net and plummets to the streets of New York. However, Kong survives the fall.

Cast
Dudley Moore as Carl Denham, King Kong (uncredited)
Jodi Benson as Ann Darrow
Randy Hamilton as Jack Driscoll
William Sage III as Roscoe
Jason Gray-Stanford as Ricky
Richard Newman as Captain Englehorn

Additional voices are: William Sage III, Don Brown, Ian James Corlett, Michael Dobson, Paul Dobson

Release dates
June 16, 1998 (United States/Canada)
1998 (United Kingdom)
1999 (Australia)

References

External links

1998 animated films
1998 films
1998 direct-to-video films
1990s American animated films
1998 fantasy films
1990s musical films
1990s monster movies
American children's animated fantasy films
American children's animated musical films
Animated films about apes
Animated films set in Manhattan
Direct-to-video animated films
Films set in the 1930s
Films set in 1933
Films set on fictional islands
King Kong (franchise) films
Lost world films
Musicals by the Sherman Brothers
Warner Bros. direct-to-video animated films
1990s children's animated films
1990s English-language films
1990s Japanese films